General elections were held in Turkey on 14 May 1950, using the multiple non-transferable vote electoral system. The result was a landslide victory for the opposition Democrat Party, which won 416 of the 487 seats.

Results

References

External links
1950 Yılı Genel Seçimlerinde Partilerin Aldıkları Oylar ve Oranları TBMM

General elections in Turkey
Turkey
Turkey
General
Election and referendum articles with incomplete results